The Asia/Oceania Zone was one of three zones of regional Federation Cup qualifying competition in 1994.  All ties were played at the Delhi LTA Complex in New Delhi, India on clay courts.

The eight teams were divided into two pools of four to compete in round-robin matches. After each of the ties had been played, the teams that finished first and second in each of the respective pools would then move on to the knockout stage of the competition. The team that won both matches of the knockout stage would go on to advance to the World Group.

Pool Stage
 Date: 2–4 May

 Teams finishing third and fourth in their group help form Asia/Oceania Zone Group II in 1995.

Knockout stage

  advanced to World Group.

References

External links
 Fed Cup Profile, Philippines
 Fed Cup Profile, Chinese Taipei
 Fed Cup Profile, India
 Fed Cup Profile, Thailand
 Fed Cup Profile, New Zealand
 Fed Cup Profile, Sri Lanka

See also
Fed Cup structure

 
Asia Oceania
Sport in New Delhi
Tennis tournaments in India
1990s in Delhi
May 1994 sports events in Asia